Plant seed proteins  are small hydrophilic proteins. They represent a subset of late embryogenesis abundant proteins, of Dure subfamily D-19 or Bray group 1. These proteins contain from 73 to 153 amino acid residues and may play a role in equipping the seed for survival, maintaining a minimal level of hydration in the dry organism and preventing the denaturation of cytoplasmic components. They may also play a role during imbibition by controlling water uptake.

References

Protein families